Helenor Alter Draper Davisson was an ordained minister in the Methodist church in Indiana. Davisson  was the first woman ordained in American Methodist Church.

Early life 
Helenor Alter was born in 1823 to John and Charity VanAusdall Alter in Pennsylvania.

Clergy 
In 1842, Davisson joined her father in his ministry, riding with him on horseback as they worked in Indiana.

Davisson was recommended for deacon's orders at the Quarterly Meeting of the Grand Prairie Circuit  in 1865 and in 1866 became the first ordained woman in American Methodism.

Personal life
In 1842, she married John Draper.

References 

1823 births
1876 deaths
American Methodist clergy
19th-century American clergy
Women Christian clergy
Religious leaders from Indiana